Petthanaikankuppam is a revenue village in Cuddalore district in state of Tamil Nadu, India.

References 

Villages in Cuddalore district